Sumbwa (or Sisumbwa/Lusumbwa) is an Eastern Bantu language, classified as F.23 by Malcolm Guthrie (1948). According to this classification, the language is assumed to be related to Kinyamwezi, Kisukuma, Kinilamba, Kirimi and other languages of Zone F (Guthrie 1948; 1967-71, although Nurse and Philippson 1980 and Maselle (2001) suggested that the language has had much influence from neighbouring languages. Quick inspection of the vocabulary shows that Sisumbwa appears to be closer to Nyamwezi than to any other language in the group (Nurse and Philippson 1980). In terms of contacts, Sisumbwa speakers say that for a long time they have been in contact with speakers of Kisubi (Biharamulo), Kirongo and Kizinza (Geita and Sengerema) and Kiha (Biharamulo and Bukombe/Kahama), in addition to Kinyamwezi and Kisukuma. 

The language is mainly spoken in Bukombe, Mbogwe and Geita districts (Geita Region); Kahama district (Shinyanga Region); Biharamulo district (Kagera Region) and Urambo district (Uyowa) – Tabora Region. Given the 2002 Census figures and population increases since then, the number of Sisumbwa speakers may be estimated as follows: Bukombe: 137,115; Kahama: 100,377; Geita: 79,490; Biharamulo: 4,306; Ilemela: 85; Kishapu: 110; Kwimba: 152; Misungwi: 103; Nzega: 358; Shinyanga (R): 2,260; Urambo: 36,755; This estimation gives 361,111 Sisumbwa speakers. These are the figures recorded in the Tanzania Language Atlas (2009:3), and this puts the language at no. 25 out of the 150 Tanzanian languages identified.

Sumbwa is still largely undescribed as there is an old grammar (Capus 1898), a trilingual dictionary (Kahigi 2008a) and description of some components of the morphology (Kahigi 2005; Kahigi 2008b).

References

Sources
 Capus, A. 1898. Grammaire de Shisumbwa. In: Zeitschrift fϋr Africanische und Oceanische Sprachen, IV, Berlin, pp. 1-123.
 Guthrie, M. 1948. The Classification of Bantu Languages. London: International African Institute.
 Kahigi, K. K. 2005. The Sisumbwa Noun: Its Classes and Derivation. In: Occasional Papers in Linguistics, 1. LOT, Univ. of Dar es Salaam. Pp. 117-154.
 Kahigi, K. K. 2008a. Sumbwa-English-Swahili/ English-Sumbwa-Swahili Dictionary. published by Language of Tanzania Project (LOT), UDSM.
 Kahigi, K. K. 2008b. Derivation in Sisumbwa. In: Occasional Papers in Linguistics, 3. LOT, Univ. of Dar es Salaam, pp. 53-81.
 Masele, Balla 2001. The Linguistic History of Sisumbwa, Kisukuma and Kinyamweezi in Bantu Zone F. Ph.D. Dissertation. St. John: Memorial University of Newfoundland.

Great Lakes Bantu languages
Languages of Tanzania